James C. McWilliams is a professor at the UCLA Institute of Geophysics and Planetary Physics and Department of Atmospheric and Oceanic Sciences.

Early life 
McWilliams was born in Oklahoma City, Oklahoma and attended high school in Tulsa. McWilliams received a B.S. in Applied Mathematics from Caltech in 1968. In 1969 and 1971, he received a M.S. and Ph.D respectively from Harvard University. McWilliams held a Research Fellowship in Geophysical Fluid Dynamics at Harvard from 1971 to 1974 and afterwards worked in the Oceanography Section at the National Center for Atmospheric Research (NCAR) where he became a Senior Scientist in 1980.  In 1994, while still retaining part-time appointment at NCAR, he began his work at UCLA where he became the Louis B. Slichter Professor of Earth Sciences in the Department of Atmospheric and Oceanic Sciences and the Institute for Geophysics and Planetary Physics.

He currently teaches graduate student classes including Geophysical Fluid Dynamics, Introduction to Ocean Science, and Atmospheric and Oceanic Turbulence. He has authored the textbook Fundamentals of Geophysical Fluid Dynamics  for use by students who have an intermediate to advanced knowledge of physics and the Earth's fluid environment.

Research 
James C. McWilliams primarily does research in computational modeling of the Earth's oceans and atmospheres. One of McWilliam's most influential papers was a paper written in 1990 titled "Isopycnal mixing in ocean circulation models", in which together with Peter Gent they proposed a subgrid-scale form of mesoscale eddy mixing on isopyncal surfaces for use in non-eddy resolving ocean circulation models.

Selected publications

Awards 
 Fellow, American Geophysical Union (2001)
 National Academy of Sciences (2002)

References 

American oceanographers
Living people
Members of the United States National Academy of Sciences
Harvard University alumni
University of California, Los Angeles faculty
California Institute of Technology alumni
Year of birth missing (living people)